Milleria is a genus of moths of the family Zygaenidae. Some sources erroneously suggested the name was a junior homonym, but the senior name was a nomen nudum, leaving the moth name as available and valid.

Species
Milleria adalifa
Milleria adalifoides
Milleria dualis
Milleria hamiltoni
Milleria lingnami
Milleria rehfousi

References

Chalcosiinae